Parkdale—High Park is a federal  electoral district in Ontario, Canada, that has been represented in the House of Commons of Canada since 1979. It was created during the 1976 electoral boundaries redistribution from parts of Parkdale, High Park—Humber Valley, Davenport and Spadina districts.  As of the October 19, 2015, Canadian general election, the current Member of Parliament (MP) is Liberal member Arif Virani.
According to the 2016 Census, Parkdale—High Park has the lowest percentage of visible minorities (26.2%) among all City of Toronto ridings; it also has the highest percentage of people of Irish (20.0%), German (9.8%), and French (8.9%) ethnic origin of all City of Toronto ridings.

Geography
It is located in the central-west part of Toronto on the lakefront. It has 106,559 residents. It is composed of the seven neighbourhoods surrounding High Park. Including the park and portions west, between the north and south borders of the park is the neighbourhood of Swansea; north of the park are the neighbourhoods of High Park North and the south half of The Junction; north-west of the park are the neighbourhoods of Runnymede-Bloor West Village and Lambton Baby Point; to the east of the park is Roncesvalles; and Parkdale directly to the south and to the south-east.

It consists of the part of the City of Toronto bounded on the south by Lake Ontario, on the west by the Humber River, and on the north and east by a line drawn from the Humber River east along the Canadian Pacific Railway, southeast along the Canadian National/Canadian Pacific Railway, west along Queen Street West, south along Dufferin Street, west along Dufferin Street, and south along the southerly production of Spencer Avenue.

History

The riding was created in 1976 from parts of Parkdale, High Park—Humber Valley, Davenport and Spadina ridings.

In 1976, it was defined to consist of the part of the City of Toronto bounded on the south by the shore of Lake Ontario,
on the north and west by the city limits, on the east by a line drawn from north to south along Runnymede Road, east along Annette Street, south along Keele Street, east along Humberside Avenue, southeast along the Canadian National Railway, south along Bathurst Street; thence southerly along Bathurst Street to the Western Channel of Toronto Harbour.

In 1987, it was defined to consist of the parts of the cities of Toronto and York bounded on the west by the city limits of Toronto and York, and on the north, east and south by a line drawn east along the Canadian Pacific Railway line, south along Runnymede Road, east along Annette Street, southeast along Dundas Street West, east along Dupont Street, southwest along the Canadian National Railway line immediately east of Dundas Street West, south along Atlantic Avenue, west along the Gardiner Expressway, south along the southerly production of Spencer Avenue.

In 1996, it was defined to consist of the parts of the cities of Toronto and York bounded on the west by the city limits of Toronto and York, and on the north, east and south by a line drawn east along the Canadian Pacific Railway, southeast along the Canadian National Railway, south along Atlantic Avenue, west along the Gardiner Expressway, and south along the southerly production of Spencer Avenue.

In 2003, it was given its current boundaries as described above. This riding was unchanged after the 2012 electoral redistribution.

Former boundaries

Demographics 
According to the Canada 2021 Census

Ethnic groups: 69.1% White, 6.0% Black, 5.1% South Asian, 3.9% Chinese, 2.7% Filipino, 2.7% Latin American, 1.9% Southeast Asian, 1.8% Indigenous

Languages: 65.8% English, 2.7% Polish, 2.4% Spanish, 1.8% French, 1.8% Portuguese, 1.6% Tibetan, 1.5% Russian, 1.4% Ukrainian, 1.1% Tagalog, 1.0% Vietnamese, 1.0% Serbian, 1.0% Cantonese

Religions: 43.1% Christian (24.1% Catholic, 4.0% Christian Orthodox, 2.8% Anglican, 2.6% United Church, 6.7% Other), 3.5% Buddhist, 2.9% Muslim, 2.0% Jewish, 1.9% Hindu, 45.3% None

Median income: $46,800 (2020)

Average income: $72,800 (2020)

Riding associations

Riding associations are the local branches of political parties:

Members of Parliament

This riding has elected the following Members of Parliament:

Election results

See also

 List of Canadian federal electoral districts
 Past Canadian electoral districts

Notes

Citations

References
 2011 results from Elections Canada
 Campaign expense data from Elections Canada

External links
Parkdale-High Park Green Party
Parkdale-High Park NDP Riding Association

Federal electoral districts of Toronto
Ontario federal electoral districts
1976 establishments in Ontario